Europa FC is a professional football club from Gibraltar, that competes in the Gibraltar National League. As with all other clubs in the territory, Europa FC currently shares the Victoria Stadium on Winston Churchill Avenue. The club also operates a women's team which competes in the Gibraltar Women's Football League.

History
The club was founded in 1925. It was continuously active up to 1970. The club merged with College in the 1980s, going by College Cosmos until 2013, and in 2015 split again from College, changing from College Europa back to Europa FC, while College 1975 entered the Gibraltar Second Division. The name change was cleared by UEFA and the Gibraltar Football Association has granted back the honours the club lost when it folded initially. 

The club saw considerable success in the late 1920s and early 1930s, where it won 4 of its 7 titles. However, against the likes of Prince of Wales, the club struggled to become a major force and won its 6th and final title in the 1951–52. After further declining fortunes, the club merged with College in 1970, although it failed to see a revival in fortunes as it would continue to move between the top two divisions of Gibraltar football for the next 40 years, last being out of the top flight in 2012–13.

Despite a 4th-place finish in the 2013–14 Gibraltar Premier Division, 2014 they were the first team from Gibraltar to play the UEFA Europa League after they finished runners-up in the Rock Cup. They lost the first match 0–3 against FC Vaduz from Liechtenstein. In the second leg they lost 1–0 at home, resulting in a 4–0 aggregate defeat. In 2015 the club had Gibraltar's first player to appear at a major international tournament, with Charly representing Equatorial Guinea at the 2015 Africa Cup of Nations.

In 2015 the club was renamed to their original name Europa FC. The side entered the UEFA Europa League once again, without a manager as Dimas Carrasco had not yet been appointed. The side lost 9–0 on aggregate to SK Slovan Bratislava with a new look side that received criticism from fans due to the lack of Gibraltarian players and large number of Spanish signings. Another season in 2nd place followed, although July 2016 did see Europa win their first continental cup tie, winning 3–2 on aggregate against FC Pyunik in the 2016-17 UEFA Europa League.

Further investment in the side under Juan Jose Gallardo saw an influx of young Gibraltarians join the Greens to align them with the league's new Home Grown Player Rule, including eventual international Sykes Garro and, most notably, key player Liam Walker from title rivals Lincoln Red Imps. The investment in the side drew dividends as the title race between Lincoln and Europa went down to the final round of games. Victory against Glacis United on 21 May, thanks to goals from Liam Walker and Kike Gómez, saw the club win their first title since 1952. A week later, the Greens won the 2017 Rock Cup, completing a domestic treble of Pepe Reyes Cup, Gibraltar Premier Division and Rock Cup for the first time in their history. However, after their extra-time defeat to The New Saints in the 2017–18 UEFA Champions League in July 2017, Gallardo stepped down from his managerial position to focus on his role as sporting director. Jonathan Parrado was brought in to take over management of the team.

Notable managers
The following manager(s) made at least one major accomplishment while in charge of Europa:

Honours

Gibraltar Premier Division
Winners (7): 1928–29, 1929–30, 1931–32, 1932–33, 1937–38, 1951–52, 2016–17
Gibraltar Second Division
Winners: 2012–13
Rock Cup
Winners (8): 1938, 1946, 1950, 1951, 1952, 2017, 2017–18, 2019
Gibraltar Premier Cup
Winners: 2014–15
Pepe Reyes Cup
Winners (4): 2016, 2018, 2019, 2021

European record

Notes
 1Q: First qualifying round
 2Q: Second qualifying round
 PR: Preliminary round

Current squad

First team

Intermediate League squad

The following players are registered to play in the Gibraltar Intermediate League. Players in the senior squad may also appear for the Intermediate team.

Club staff

References

External links 
 Official Website
 
 College Europa FC at UEFA.com

 
Football clubs in Gibraltar
Gibraltar National League clubs
Association football clubs established in 1925
1925 establishments in Gibraltar